Nicolas Pétorin (born 24 June 1972) is a French former competitive figure skater. He is the 1991 World Junior bronze medalist, a two-time Nebelhorn Trophy silver medalist, and a four-time French national medalist. Pétorin competed at the 1992 Winter Olympics, placing 14th.

At an event in Sofia on 4 February 1988, Pétorin became the first French skater to land a triple Axel in international competition.

Results

References

Living people
1972 births
French male single skaters
Olympic figure skaters of France
Figure skaters at the 1992 Winter Olympics
World Junior Figure Skating Championships medalists
People from Niort
Sportspeople from Deux-Sèvres